The year 2020 is the 5th year in the history of the Brave Combat Federation, a mixed martial arts promotion based in Bahrain.

2020-2021 BRAVE CF Flyweight Tournament

BRAVE CF Flyweight Tournament bracket 

1Zach Makovsky got a Quarterfinal bye as Abdul Hussein pulled out due to illness during the weightcut. 

2First bout between Torres and Sean Santella ended in a draw at Brave CF 42; Santella was replaced for the rematch by Blaine O’Driscoll due to injury and the bout was held at the Catchweight of 61 kgs 

<noinclude>

Brave CF 34: Slovenia

Brave CF 34: Slovenia (also known as WFC 24: Caged) was a mixed martial arts event held by Brave Combat Federation in partnership with World Freefight Challenge on January 19, 2020 at the Hala Tivoli in Ljubljana, Slovenia.

Background

Results

Brave CF 35

BRAVE CF 35  was a mixed martial arts event held by Brave Combat Federation in partnership with Real Xtreme Fighting that took place on July 20, 2020 at the Berăria H in Bucharest, Romania.

Background

Results

Brave CF 36 

BRAVE CF 36  was a mixed martial arts event scheduled held by Brave Combat Federation in partnership with Real Xtreme Fighting that took place on July 27, 2020 at the Berăria H in Bucharest, Romania.

Background

Results

Brave CF 37

Brave CF 37  was a mixed martial arts event scheduled to be held by Brave Combat Federation in co-promotion with Bulldog Fight Night on August 1, 2020, in Stockholm, Sweden.

Results

Brave CF 38 

Brave CF 38  was a mixed martial arts event scheduled to be held by Brave Combat Federation in co-promotion with Bulldog Fight Night on August 8, 2020, in Stockholm, Sweden.

Results

Brave CF 39 

Brave CF 39  was a mixed martial arts event scheduled to be held by Brave Combat Federation in co-promotion with Bulldog Fight Night on August 15, 2020, in Stockholm, Sweden.

Results

Brave CF 40 

Brave CF 40  was a mixed martial arts event scheduled to be held by Brave Combat Federation in co-promotion with Bulldog Fight Night on August 24, 2020, in Stockholm, Sweden.

Results

Brave CF 41

Brave CF 41  was a mixed martial arts event scheduled to be held by Brave Combat Federation on September 17, 2020, in Riffa, Bahrain.

Results

Brave CF 42

Brave CF 42  was a mixed martial arts event scheduled to be held by Brave Combat Federation on September 24, 2020, in Riffa, Bahrain.

Results

Brave CF 43

Brave CF 43  was a mixed martial arts event scheduled to be held by Brave Combat Federation on October 01, 2020, in Riffa, Bahrain.

Results

Brave CF 44

Brave CF 44  was a mixed martial arts event scheduled to be held by Brave Combat Federation on November 05, 2020, in Riffa, Bahrain.

Results

Brave CF 45

Brave CF 45  was a mixed martial arts event scheduled to be held by Brave Combat Federation on November 19, 2020, in Riffa, Bahrain.

Results

See also 

 List of current Brave CF fighters
 List of current mixed martial arts champions

References 

Brave Combat Federation
Brave Combat Federation
Brave Combat Federation